Afriansyah (born 26 April 1991), is an Indonesian professional footballer who plays as a striker for Liga 2 club PSPS Riau.

Club career

Semen Padang
In 2018, Afriansyah signed a contract with Indonesian Liga 2 club Semen Padang.

Muba Babel United
He was signed for Muba Babel United to play in Liga 2 in the 2019 season.

Sriwijaya
In 2021, Afriansyah signed a contract with Indonesian Liga 2 club Sriwijaya. He made his league debut on 6 October 2021 against Muba Babel United at the Gelora Sriwijaya Stadium, Palembang.

Honours

Club 
Semen Padang
 Liga 2 runner-up: 2018

References

External links 
 Afriansyah at Soccerway
 Afriansyah at Liga Indonesia

1991 births
Living people
Indonesian footballers
Association football forwards
Semen Padang F.C. players
Muba Babel United F.C. players
BaBel United F.C. players
Cilegon United players
Persita Tangerang players
Sportspeople from the Bangka Belitung Islands